"Can't Stop" is a song by Canadian soul and R&B music group jacksoul. It was released in February 2000 as the lead single from their second studio album, Sleepless. The song was a hit in Canada, reaching #8 on Canada's singles chart.  The song was nominated for "Best Single" at the 2001 Juno Awards. Also in 2001 the song was named by SOCAN as one of Canada's most performed pop songs.

Track listing
 Can't Stop (radio edit)
 Can't Stop (original album version)
 Sleepless

Music video
The music video for "Can't Stop" features lead singer Haydain Neale walking around various parts of Los Angeles. The video reached the #2 spot on MuchMusic Countdown for two consecutive weeks.

Charts

References

External links

2000 singles
2000 songs
Canadian contemporary R&B songs
Sony Music singles